The 1964 Bowling Green Falcons football team was an American football team that represented Bowling Green State University in the Mid-American Conference (MAC) during the 1964 NCAA University Division football season. In their tenth and final season under head coach Doyt Perry, the Falcons compiled a 9–1 record (5–1 against MAC opponents), won the MAC championship, and outscored opponents by a combined total of 275 to 87.

The team's statistical leaders included Jerry Ward with 726 passing yards, Stew Williams with 609 rushing yards, and Jay Cunningham with 174 receiving yards.

Doyt Perry resigned as the team's head football coach after the 1965 season but remained the school's athletic director until 1970.  He was inducted into the College Football Hall of Fame in 1988.

Schedule

References

Bowling Green
Bowling Green Falcons football seasons
Mid-American Conference football champion seasons
Bowling Green Falcons football